‌The 2022 IHF Men's Super Globe was the 16th edition of the yearly club world championship in handball, held from 18 to 23 October 2022 in Dammam, Saudi Arabia under the aegis of the International Handball Federation (IHF). It was the third time in history that the event was organised by the Saudi Arabian Handball Federation.

SC Magdeburg defeated Barcelona in the final to defend their title.

Venue
The championship was played in Dammam, at the Dammam Sports Hall.

Referees
At the first two matchdays, it was tested to use three referees instead of the common two. After the second day they used the normal two pairs. Ten referees were used:

Teams
Twelve teams competed in the tournament: the winners of the continental tournaments, the defending champion, two host teams and two wild card teams.

Draw
The draw was held on 29 September 2022.

Seeding

Preliminary round
All times are local (UTC+3).

Group A

Group B

Group C

Group D

Knockout stage

9–12th place bracket

9–12th place semifinals

Eleventh place game

Ninth place game

5–8th place bracket

5–8th place semifinals

Seventh place game

Fifth place game

Championship bracket

Semifinals

Third place game

Final

Final ranking

Broadcasters

References

External links
 IHF website
 Superglobe KSA website

2022 in handball
2022 in Saudi Arabian sport
October 2022 sports events in Asia
Handball in Saudi Arabia
International handball competitions hosted by Saudi Arabia
2022